The IEEE Jack S. Kilby Signal Processing Medal is presented "for outstanding achievements in signal processing" theory, technology or commerce.  The recipients of this award will receive a gold medal, together with a replica in bronze, a certificate and an honorarium.

The award was established in 1995 by the Institute of Electrical and Electronics Engineers (IEEE) and is sponsored by Texas Instruments Inc.  It is named after Jack S. Kilby, whose innovation – like the co-invention of the integrated circuit – was fundamental for the signal processor and related digital signal processing development. The award may be presented to an individual or a group up to three in number.

Nomination deadline: 1 July

Notification: Recipients are typically approved during the November IEEE Board of Directors meeting. Recipients and their nominators will be notified following the meeting. Then the nominators of unsuccessful candidates will be notified of the status of their nomination.

Presentation: At the annual IEEE Honors Ceremony

Recipients 
The following people have received the IEEE Jack S. Kilby Signal Processing Medal:
 2021: Emmanuel Candès, Justin Romberg and Terence Tao 
 2020: Ramalingam Chellappa
 2019: Alan Willsky
 2018: Bede Liu
 2017: Martin Vetterli
 2016: Louis Scharf
 2015: Harry L. Van Trees
 2014: Thomas P. Barnwell, III
 2013: Bishnu S. Atal 
 2012: G. Clifford Carter
 2011: Ingrid Daubechies
 2010: Ronald W. Schafer
 2009: Charles Sidney Burrus
 2008: Robert M. Gray
 2007: Alan V. Oppenheim
 2006: Thomas Kailath
 2005: Fumitada Itakura
 2004: Thomas W. Parks and James H. McClellan
 2003: Hans W. Schuessler
 2002: James W. Cooley
 2001: Thomas S. Huang and Arun N. Netravali
 2000: James F. Kaiser
 1999: Lawrence R. Rabiner
 1998: Thomas G. Stockham
 1997: Bernard Gold and Charles M. Rader

References 

Jack S. Kilby Signal Processing Medal